Prodege, formally Prodege LLC, is an American online marketing, consumer polling, and market research company based in El Segundo, California. The company develops consumer rewards and polling programs under various brands including Swagbucks, MyPoints, ShopAtHome, InboxDollars, CouponCause, Ysense, and Upromise.

History
Prodege was founded in Torrance, California in 2005 by entrepreneur Josef Gorowitz. The company originally partnered with search providers to build a platform for raising charitable donations.  Supporters of the charities would earn money for the charities while surfing and shopping using white labeled web browsers. The company started offering the custom browsers to brands as a way to earn money from their fans' online activities. Early customers included the Green Bay Packers football team, and singer Kanye West. 

In February 2008, Prodege launched  Swagbucks.com – under Co-Founders Josef Gorowitz and Scott Dudelson – and introduced the SB as a digital currency earned for activity throughout its network of websites. By shopping and playing online games, customers would earn Swagbucks (SB), points which could be redeemed for gift cards and other merchandise. Swagbucks is an online rewards portal.

In January 2013, Prodege Founder Josef Gorowitz appointed former Shopzilla and Fandango CEO Chuck Davis as the company's executive chairman.

In May 2014, Prodege announced that Technology Crossover Ventures (TCV) had invested $60 million into Prodege, parent company of Swagbucks and other portfolio brands, and that Prodege also had appointed Executive Chairman Chuck Davis as its new CEO and Chairman, while Josef Gorowitz assumed the title of Founder and President. Also, in May 2014, TCV Venture partner Chuck Davis, who was previously CEO of movie ticket vendor Fandango, became Prodege's CEO. 

In July 2014, Prodege announced its acquisition of SodaHead.com, an online polling technology platform founded by Jason Feffer. SodaHead.com CEO Chris Dominguez and Founder Jason Feffer joined Prodege's executive leadership team in the move.

In April 2016, Prodege bought rewards site MyPoints from United Online, the company formed by the merger of online services companies NetZero and Juno Online Services.

In August 2017, the company acquired Greenwood Village, Colorado-based cash back shopping and coupon site ShopAtHome.

In May 2019, the company bought Cotterweb Enterprises, a Minnesota-based operator of reward sites in the US, Canada and the UK. In July, Prodege partnered with online local service deal company Groupon to develop a local merchant reward card program for customers.

By 2020, Prodege’s products had over 120 million users, and as of 2019, had rewarded $725 million to its users since its inception.

In February 2020, Prodege bought digital coupon company CouponCause. In May, Prodege bought Upromise, a provider of college savings plan loyalty programs, from student loan company Sallie Mae.

Prodege partnered with Isometric Solutions and Panel Consulting to provide polling for the Prediction Survey, a political forecast developed by Thomas Miller during the 2020 Georgia Senate election.

In February 2022, Prodege acquires pollfish a survey platform

In July 2022, Prodege acquires adgatemedia a digital advertising company

Services
Prodege offers online marketing services under several different brands.

Swagbucks - a website and application where users shop and watch videos for cash rewards and gift cards.
MyPoints - an online rewards site.
ShopAtHome - a cash back shopping and coupon site.
InboxDollars - an online rewards site.
CouponCause - a coupon site that donates the money users save to non-profits.
Upromise - a coupon site that contributes to education savings accounts.
Ysense - a gift card rewards program for customers that shop and watch videos.
Tada - a site that can give rewards from Receipts.

The company also operates consumer reward card program with other companies.

References

External links
Prodege Official Site

Reward websites
Customer loyalty programs
2005 establishments in California
Companies based in El Segundo, California
Marketing companies established in 2005
Market research companies of the United States
Internet properties established in 2008